The U.S. Department of Agriculture Cotton Annex is an office building located at 300 12th Street SW in Washington, D.C. The size of the building has been variously given at 89,000 square feet and 118,000 square feet.

History and architecture
The Cotton Annex was built from 1936 and 1937 for the United States Department of Agriculture (USDA). The building was originally for offices and laboratories of the USDA's Bureau of Agricultural Economics (BAE), which was previously housed in headquarters that were being demolished as part of the expansion of the Bureau of Engraving and Printing. The site selected for the Cotton Annex was in accordance with the 1901 McMillan Plan. Funds for the construction were appropriated by Congress in the Public Buildings Act of 1926.

The Cotton Annex was designed by the Supervising Architect of the Treasury, Louis A. Simon. It is a six-story brick building in the Stripped Classical architectural style. The Cotton Annex "has distinctive walls of variegated buff-colored brick laid in an all-stretcher bond, and is covered with a flat roof with limestone coping and a tall parapet roof on the west and north elevations."

The Cotton Annex was the headquarters of the USDA Cotton Division from the building's completion until 1964, when the Cotton Division's Standards section moved to Memphis, Tennessee. Other USDA divisions moved into the empty laboratory space, and other offices of the Cotton Division remained in the Cotton Annex until 1982.

In 1982, the General Services Administration (GSA) acquired ownership of the building. The USDA vacated the building in 2007, giving maintenance and repair responsibilities to the GSA. In October 2007, the GSA and the Federal Protective Service (FPS) entered an agreement for the FPS to use land on the Cotton Annex complex as a screening facility for inspection of trucks making deliveries to the Ronald Reagan Building and International Trade Center. The building itself, however, remains vacant.

In May 2007, the Subcommittee on Economic Development, Public Buildings and Emergency Management of the United States House Committee on Transportation and Infrastructure held a "field hearing" at the Cotton Annex. Chairman John Mica of Florida, a Republican, pressured the GSA to sell the building. GSA Public Buildings Service Commissioner Bob Peck testified that although the complex's operation costs are $279,000, the FPS covers those costs as part of the rental agreement for the property.

In April 2014, GSA Administrator Dan Tangherlini proposed making a deal with developers to trade the Cotton Annex and the GSA's own regional headquarters in exchange for work on the GSA's main headquarters and the long-delayed Department of Homeland Security consolidation project, a project to build a new consolidated DHS headquarters at the former St. Elizabeths Hospital site in Southwest DC.

February 9, 2017, Jemal Cotton Annex LLC bought the Cotton Annex with a bid of $30.3 million. December 14, 2018, an additional parcel north of the Cotton Annex property was sold to Jemal Cotton Annex LLC via sealed bid.

See also
 National Register of Historic Places listings in the District of Columbia
 Southwest Federal Center, Washington, D.C.
 Jamie L. Whitten Building
 United States Department of Agriculture South Building

References

Government buildings completed in 1937
Government buildings on the National Register of Historic Places in Washington, D.C.
Stripped Classical architecture in the United States
United States Department of Agriculture facilities
Cotton industry in the United States